Thondan is a 1995 Indian Tamil-language political drama film directed by Karvannan. The film stars Murali and Rohini, with Anandaraj, Manivannan, Srividya, Vinodhini, Vadivukkarasi, Gnanavel and S. Ramadoss playing supporting roles. It was released on 10 March 1995.

Plot

Jeeva (Murali) is an angry young who works as an auto-driver. During his childhood, Jeeva could not go to school because of his father, who forced him to work at a very young age, thus he suffers from an inferiority complex. Every time, he sees a child working, Jeeva feels angry and he then forces the kid to go to school at any cost. Unlike Jeeva, his childhood friend Ilavenil (Anandaraj) pursued an education and he is now a conscientious police officer.

Periyanayagam (Gnanavel) is a company owner employing child labour and he is involved in some kind of illegal business. Periyanayagam has the support of the Minister (Manivannan) who helps him when he is in trouble with the police, which irks the police officer Ilavenil.

Sanjeevi Raman (S. Ramadoss) is a doctor and a political crusader who fights against child labour for many years and he filed a lawsuit against this practice. He won the lawsuit, and subsequently, companies who forced kids to work are now banned by the government. Periyanayagam and the other company owners decide to kill the doctor. While planning their attack, the street dancer Selvi (Vinodhini) hears their plan and she is killed on the spot. The librarian Subha (Rohini) witnesses the murder and runs away from the murderers. In a big trouble, Jeeva comes to protect Subha from Periyanayagam's henchmen. What transpires later forms the crux of the story.

Cast

Murali as Jeeva
Rohini as Subha
Anandaraj as Ilavenil
Manivannan as Minister
Srividya as Singer
Vinodhini as Selvi
Vadivukkarasi
Gnanavel as Periyanayagam
S. Ramadoss as Dr. Sanjeevi Raman
Loose Mohan as Police constable
Kumarimuthu
Kanshyam
Indrajith
Williams
Kaaliswaran
Sanjay Kanth
Madurai Murugesh
Madurai Ramasekhar
Kanchi Durai
Sathyanath
Sankar
Pon Manikkam
Rangammal
Jayaprakash (uncredited role)
Karunanidhi as himself

Soundtrack

The film score and the soundtrack were composed by Rajan Sarma. The soundtrack, released in 1995, features 5 tracks with lyrics written by Rajan Sarma.

References

1995 films
1990s Tamil-language films
1990s political drama films
Indian political drama films